Arthur John Chitty (27 May 1859 – 6 January 1908) was an English first-class cricketer and barrister.

The son of Joseph William Chitty, he was born in May 1859 at Marylebone. He was educated at Eton College, before going up to Balliol College, Oxford. While studying at Oxford, he made two appearances in first-class cricket for Oxford University against the Gentlemen of England and the Marylebone Cricket Club at Oxford in 1879. He scored 23 runs in his two matches, with a high score of 10 not out.

A student of the Middle Temple, Chitty was called to the bar in January 1885. He died at South Kensington in January 1908. His brothers-in-law Edward Bradby and Henry Bradby both played first-class cricket.

References

External links

1859 births
1908 deaths
People from Marylebone
People educated at Eton College
Alumni of Balliol College, Oxford
English cricketers
Oxford University cricketers
Members of Lincoln's Inn
19th-century English lawyers
English barristers